<noinclude>

Monica Denise Arnold (formerly Brown; born October 24, 1980) is an American singer, rapper and actress. Born and raised in College Park, Georgia, she began performing as a child and became part of a traveling gospel choir at the age of ten. Monica rose to prominence after she signed with Rowdy Records in 1993 and released her debut album Miss Thang two years later. She followed it with a series of successful albums, including the global bestseller The Boy Is Mine (1998) as well as the number-one albums After the Storm (2003), The Makings of Me (2006) and Still Standing (2010).

Monica's popularity was further enhanced by her appearances in television series such as Living Single (1996), Felicity (2001), and American Dreams (2003), and films including Boys and Girls (2000), Love Song (2000), and Pastor Brown (2009). In 2008, she served as a key advisor on the NBC talent show The Voice. The recording of the song "Still Standing" along with her personal life, resulted in her own highly rated BET series Monica: Still Standing.

Throughout her career, several of Monica's singles became number-one hits on the pop and R&B charts, including "Before You Walk Out of My Life", "Don't Take It Personal (Just One of Dem Days)", "Like This and Like That", "The Boy Is Mine" (with Brandy), "The First Night", "Angel of Mine", "So Gone", and "Everything to Me".

Monica has sold 5.3 million albums in the United States. In 2010, Billboard listed Monica at number 24 on its list of the Top 50 R&B and Hip Hop Artists of the past 25 years. A four-time nominee, she won a Grammy Award for Best R&B Performance by a Duo or Group with Vocals for her contribution to "The Boy Is Mine", at the 41st awards ceremony. In addition she is the recipient of one Billboard Music Award, one BET Award, and two BMI Pop Awards.

Early life
Monica Denise Arnold was born in College Park, Georgia, the only daughter of Marilyn Best, a Delta Air Lines customer service representative and former church singer, and M.C. "Billy" Arnold Jr, who was a mechanic for an Atlanta freight company. Arnold's mother is of African American descent and her father is African American with Indian and Irish ancestry. She has a younger brother, Montez (born in 1983), and a half brother, Jermond Grant, on her father's side.  Monica is also a cousin of record producer Polow da Don, and is related to rapper Ludacris through her mother's second marriage to Reverend Edward Best, a Methodist minister.

At the age of 2, Monica followed in her mother's footsteps with regular performances at the Jones Hill Chapel United Methodist Church in Marilyn's hometown Newnan, Georgia. While growing up in the modest circumstances of a single-parent home after her parents' 1984 separation and 1987 divorce, Monica continued training herself in singing and became a frequent talent-show contestant, winning over 20 local singing competitions throughout her early teenage years. When she was 10 years old, she became the youngest member of "Charles Thompson and the Majestics", a traveling 12-person gospel choir. She attended North Clayton High School with rapper 2 Chainz. She graduated from high school in 1997 at age 16, having skipped ahead scholastically by studying year-round with a private tutor.

Career

1991–2000: Miss Thang and The Boy Is Mine

In 1991, at the age of eleven, Monica was discovered by music producer Dallas Austin at the Center Stage auditorium in Atlanta, performing Whitney Houston 1986's "Greatest Love of All". Amazed by her voice, Dallas offered her a record deal with his Arista Records-distributed label Rowdy Records and consulted rapper Queen Latifah to work as Monica's first manager. Shortly afterwards Dallas and then staff producers Tim & Bob entered the studio with Monica to start writing and producing her debut Miss Thang, which was eventually released in July 1995 and reached number thirty-six on the U.S. Billboard 200 and number seven on the Top R&B Albums chart. To date the album has sold 1.5 million copies in the United States. In January 2000 it was certified triple platinum by the RIAA for three million shipped units . The album produced three top ten singles, including debut single "Don't Take It Personal (Just One of Dem Days)" and "Before You Walk Out of My Life", which made Monica the youngest artist ever to have two consecutive chart-topping hits on the U.S. Billboard Hot R&B Singles chart. Miss Thang subsequently won Monica a Billboard Music Award and garnered her an American Music Award nomination in the Favorite Soul/R&B New Artist category.

After a label change to Clive Davis' Arista Records, Monica's mainstream success was boosted, when "For You I Will", from the Space Jam soundtrack (1996) became her next top ten pop hit. The song was written by Diane Warren. The following year she was asked to team up with singer Brandy and producer Rodney "Darkchild" Jerkins to record "The Boy Is Mine", the first single from both of their second albums. Released in May 1998, surrounding highly publicized rumors about a real-life catfight between both singers, the duet became both the biggest hit of the summer and the biggest hit of 1998 in general in America, spending thirteen weeks on top of the Billboard Hot 100 chart. It earned the pair a Grammy Award for Best R&B Performance by a Duo or Group with Vocal" and garnered multi-platinum sales (to date, it remains as one of the top twenty most successful American singles in history based on Billboard chart success).
Jermaine Dupri, David Foster and Austin consulted on the album The Boy Is Mine, which was released later that year and it eventually became Monica's biggest-selling album; selling over 2,016,000 copies.
In June 2000 , the album was certified triple platinum by the RIAA for three million shipped units. It yielded another two U.S. number-one hits with "The First Night" and "Angel of Mine", a cover of Eternal's 1997 single, as well as a remake of Richard Marx' "Right Here Waiting". Rolling Stone proclaimed it "closer to soul's source... harking back past hip-hop songbirds like Mary J. Blige and adult-contemporary sirens like Toni Braxton", while AllMusic called the album an "irresistible sounding [and] immaculately crafted musical backdrop [...] as good as mainstream urban R&B gets in 1998." Monica has also made guest appearances on several television shows such as Living Single (1996), Beverly Hills, 90210 (1997, 1999) and the Cartoon Network special Brak Presents The Brak Show Starring Brak (2000).

2000–2005: All Eyez on Me and After the Storm
In 2000, Monica made her film debut in the third drama from MTV Films, Love Song, as Camille Livingston, a young woman torn between the life her parents have planned for her and the world she experiences after meeting a musician from the wrong side of the tracks. The film debut the song "What My Heart Says" with the promotion of her third album All Eyez on Me (2002). The film was released on April 30, 2002, and in Felicity (2001) and American Dreams (2003) playing Mary Wells, singing "My Guy".

In 2000, Monica contributed chorus vocals for "I've Got to Have It", a collaboration with Jermaine Dupri and rapper Nas. Released as the Big Momma's House theme song, the song saw minor success in the United States only. The following year, she released the Ric Wake production track "Just Another Girl", recorded for the Down to Earth soundtrack, as a single.
A year later, Monica channeled much of her heavily media-discussed experiences into the production of her third studio album, All Eyez on Me, her first release on mentor Clive Davis newly founded J Records label. "I just wanted to give the people back something that had personal passion, instead of just, 'Oh, let's dance to this record'," she said about the issues worked into the tracks. The first single "All Eyez on Me", a Rodney Jerkins-produced R&B-dance track, saw minor to moderate success on the international charts but failed to enter the higher half of the U.S. Billboard Hot 100 chart. A follow-up song, "Too Hood", also got a lukewarm response and as a result, the album's tentative release was pushed back several times. "I don't think people wanted to hear a big fun record from me, after knowing all the things that I had personally experienced," Monica second-guessed her new material which saw both early and heavy bootlegging via internet at that time.

After the Japan-wide release of All Eyez on Me, Monica was asked to substantially reconstruct the record with a host of new producers, and as a result she re-entered recording studios to start work with songwriters Kanye West, Jazze Pha, Andre "mrDEYO" Deyo, Bam & Ryan and Dupri – replacing executive producer Missy Elliott. Released in June 2003, After the Storm debuted at number one on the Billboard 200 chart with first-week sales of 185,500 copies. This was Monica's first and only time reaching number-one on the chart. It eventually received a gold certification, and has sold 1,023,000 copies to date. Media reception of the CD was generally enthusiastic, with AllMusic saying the album "has all the assuredness and smart developments that should keep Monica's younger longtime followers behind her — all the while holding the ability to appeal to a wider spectrum of R&B and hip-hop fans." The album's lead single, Elliott-penned "So Gone", was one of Monica's biggest commercial successes in years, becoming her first top ten single since 1999's "Angel of Mine". In addition, it reached the top position of the Billboard R&B/Hip-Hop Tracks and Hot Dance Club Play charts. Subsequently, After the Storm spawned another three singles, with final single "U Should've Known Better" reaching number nineteen on the Billboard Hot 100 chart.

2006–2010: The Makings of Me, Still Standing, and reality television

Towards the end of 2006, Monica released her next studio album The Makings of Me. Titled after Curtis Mayfield's recording "The Makings of You", it saw her particularly reuniting with producers Elliott, Dupri, and Bryan Michael Cox; they had previously contributed to After the Storm. The album received a positive reception from most professional music critics, with AllMusic calling it a "concise and mostly sweet set of songs", and Entertainment Weekly declaring it "a solid addition" to Monica's discography. While it debuted at number one on Billboards Top R&B/Hip-Hop albums chart, and at number eight on the official Billboard 200, it widely failed to revive the success of its predecessors. Singles such as snap-influenced "Everytime tha Beat Drop" featuring Atlanta hip hop group Dem Franchize Boyz and Elliott-produced "A Dozen Roses (You Remind Me)" failed to reach the top forty of the regular pop charts. The same year, she made a cameo appearance in the American comedy-drama film ATL, playing the Waffle House waitress.

In August 2008, Monica appeared in the Peachtree TV reality show special Monica: The Single, which tracked the recording of the song "Still Standing" for her same-titled sixth studio album. The following year, she lent her voice to the ballad "Trust", a duet with Keyshia Cole, that peaked in the top five on Billboard Hot R&B/Hip-Hop Songs chart, and joined the cast of Rockmond Dunbar's drama film Pastor Brown. In 2010, with the success of the 2008 one-hour special, Monica joined the production of the BET network for her own series Monica: Still Standing, producing a spin-off her Peachtree show, containing the same concept. It focused on finding a hit single for the album's release while balancing her personal life as a full-time mother and dealing with her troubled past. The premiere and encore episode garnered 3.2 million total viewers, while the show itself was made the second-highest series debut in BET history behind the debut of Tiny & Toya, and was given a B rating by Entertainment Weekly.

Featuring production by Stargate, Ne-Yo, and Polow da Don, Still Standing was released in March 2010 and garnered a generally positive response by critics, who perceived its sound as "a return to the mid-'1990s heyday" of contemporary R&B, The album debuted atop on Billboards Top R&B/Hip-Hop albums chart, and number two on the Billboard 200 with opening week sales of 184,000 copies, becoming her highest-charting album in years. Lead single "Everything to Me" scored Monica her biggest chart success since 2003's "So Gone", reaching the top position of the Billboard R&B/Hip-Hop Tracks charts for seven weeks. The album was certified gold by the RIAA with domestic shipments of 500,000 copies within a single month. With it success, the album and "Everything to Me" were nominated for a Grammy Award for Best R&B Album and Best Female R&B Vocal Performance, presented at the 53rd Grammy Awards in 2011. In March 2010, it was announced that Monica and Hill had split in October 2009, surrounding rumors that he cheated. Monica and NBA player Shannon Brown met in June 2010 when while they shot her music video for her second single "Love All Over Me". On November 22, 2010, Monica married Brown in a secret ceremony at their Los Angeles home, follow by a second wedding in front of close family on July 9, 2011. Also in 2010, Monica joined Trey Songz on his Passion, Pain & Pleasure Tour, her first North American concert tour in ten years.

2011–2016: New Life and Code Red

In 2011, Monica joined the debut season of the reality talent show The Voice as an adviser to musician coach Cee Lo Green. In April 2012, her seventh studio album, New Life, was released. It marked her first release with RCA, following the disbandment of J Records in October 2011. Reception for the album was generally mixed; AllMusic complimented the album's "saucy, spirited, and soulful vibe" while Adam Markovitz of Entertainment Weekly criticized its "cheesy choruses and outdated tunes". Commercially, New Life debuted at number four on the Billboard 200 and number two on the Top R&B/Hip-Hop Albums. The album spawned two preview singles, "Anything (To Find You)" and "Until It's Gone", both of which peaked in the top 30 on the Billboard R&B/Hip-Hop Songs chart. Lead single "It All Belongs to Me", another duet with singer Brandy, charted similarly, reaching number 23 on the same chart. The same year, Monica along with Fred Hammond was featured on gospel music recording artist James Fortune and FIYA's single "Hold On" which became a top five hit on the Christian Songs chart and garnered a Grammy Award nomination for Best Gospel Song at the 54th awards ceremony.

In October 2013, Monica appeared on the soundtrack of Malcolm D. Lee's Christmas comedy-drama The Best Man Holiday with her Jermaine Dupri-produced rendition of "Have Yourself a Merry Little Christmas". In December 2015, her eighth studio album Code Red was released. Upon its release, the album received generally mixed reviews from most music critics, and debuted at number 27 on the US Billboard 200 chart. Leading single "Just Right for Me", a collaboration with Lil Wayne, reached number twelve on the Billboard Adult R&B Songs chart but failed to impact elsewhere, resulting in lackluster sales in general and the release of no further singles. In support of the album, Monica embarked on her first solo concert tour in years, The Code Red Experience to promote Code Red. In November 2016, Monica announced her departure from her longtime label RCA Records after two decades.

2018–present: New music and Verzuz
In December 2018, Monica released the ballad "Be Human" to introduce The Be Human Foundation, a non profit organization founded by herself. The same month, she previewed music from her ninth studio album Trenches when she appeared on the seventh season of the VH1 reality series T.I. & Tiny: The Family Hustle. In January 2019, she released "Commitment", the first single on her own label, Mondeenise Music. A sleeper hit, "Commitment" reached number one on the US Billboard Adult R&B Songs in the week ending July 21, 2019, becoming her first chart topper in nine years. This was followed by the release of "Me + You" in April 2019 and title track "Trenches" featuring Lil Baby. The release of "Trenches" coincided with Monica and Brandy's appearances on the webcast battle series Verzuz which took place on August 31, 2020, at Tyler Perry Studios in Atlanta. At least 1.2 million people tuned in for the battle.

On July 15, 2022, Monica released a new single, "Friends", featuring Ty Dolla $ign. On March 3, 2023, Monica released "Trusting God", a collaboration with singer James Fortune.

Artistry and influences
Monica possesses an alto vocal range, which Billboard's Erika Ramirez described as "impeccable". Elysa Gardner of the Los Angeles Times likened her "husky, dramatic alto" to that of singer Toni Braxton. Writing that the singer arguably possesses "the best alto of her generation", PopMatters contributor Tyler Lewis said Monica has "always been able to elevate even the most generic material ... with conviction and the sheer beauty of her voice", despite believing she uses "a little too much vibrato at times".

Monica has said many times that Whitney Houston is her biggest inspiration and influence since childhood. Another big influence is Mary J. Blige. Other artists she looks up to are Betty Wright, Gladys Knight and Anita Baker.

Personal life
Monica's career slowed down in 1999 due to having problems in her relationship with ex-boyfriend Jarvis Weems. In July 2000, the couple were together at the gravesite of Weems's brother, who had died in an automobile accident at age 25 in 1998. Weems then, without warning, put a gun to his head and committed suicide. "Afterward, I felt, 'What else could I have done?' You replay that situation over and over and you switch it around: Maybe if I had said this, or if I would have done that,'" Monica said in an interview with The Cincinnati Enquirer the following year. "It's just something that it's never possible for me to go back and change." Monica briefly dated rapper, C-Murder, until he was incarcerated for a murder in 2003.

Monica met rapper Rodney "Rocko" Hill, a former SWA officer and real estate manager, shortly after Weems's suicide, a time which she described as her "weakest". While the pair soon began dating in the fall of the same year, they ended their relationship in 2004. A few months later, Monica and Hill reunited and she became pregnant with their first child. On May 21, 2005, she gave birth to their son, Rodney, who performs under "Rodneyy" as a SoundCloud rapper. Monica and Hill 
then became engaged on Christmas Eve 2007, shortly before the birth of their second child. On January 8, 2008, their son named Romelo Montez Hill, after Monica's younger brother, was born. The couple split in early 2010.

In June 2010, Monica met NBA player Shannon Brown while she was looking for someone to play the love interest in her video for the song "Love All Over Me". In October 2010, she announced her engagement to Brown via her Twitter account, posting a photo of a rose-cut diamond ring. On November 22, 2010, the couple married in a secret ceremony at their Los Angeles home. Their wedding, however, did not become a matter of public record until January 21, 2011, when Brown told the Hip-Hop Non-Stop TV-Show. A second wedding ceremony was held for family and friends to attend in July 2011. On September 3, 2013, Monica gave birth to her third child, Laiyah Shannon. After eight years of marriage, Monica filed for divorce from Brown in March 2019. In October 2019, their divorce was finalized.

Discography

Miss Thang (1995)
The Boy Is Mine (1998)
All Eyez on Me (2002)
After the Storm (2003)
The Makings of Me (2006)
Still Standing (2010)
New Life (2012)
Code Red (2015)

Awards and nominations

Filmography

References

External links

[ Monica] at Billboard.com

1980 births
Living people
20th-century American actresses
20th-century African-American women singers
21st-century American actresses
21st-century American businesswomen
21st-century American businesspeople
21st-century African-American women singers
African-American actresses
African-American businesspeople
African-American female dancers
African-American women singer-songwriters
African-American women rappers
African-American Methodists
American child singers
American contraltos
American contemporary R&B singers
American hip hop singers
American women pop singers
Arista Records artists
Southern hip hop musicians
Grammy Award winners
J Records artists
People from College Park, Georgia
RCA Records artists
American women hip hop musicians
African-American women in business
American people of Irish descent
Singer-songwriters from Georgia (U.S. state)